Niniche may refer to:

 Niniche (play), an 1878 play
 Niniche (1918 film), an Italian silent film
 Niniche (1925 film), a German silent film